Humani generis could refer to the following papal encyclicals:
 1917 Humani generis redemptionem -- Benedict XV on preaching
 1939 Humani generis unitas -- Pius XI on antisemitism (never promulgated) 
 1950 Humani generis -- Pius XII on theological issues and evolution